Scipione Cignaroli  (1715-1766) was an Italian painter.

Life
The son of Martino Cignaroli, he received his first instruction from his father, and then went to Rome, where he became a scholar of Tempesta. He was a successful imitator of the style of his master, and of the works of Gaspard Dughet and Salvator Rosa. His pictures are chiefly at Milan and Turin.

References

Sources
 

1715 births
1766 deaths
18th-century Italian painters
Italian male painters
18th-century Italian male artists